El Barde District, is a district of the southwestern Bakool region of Somalia. Its capital is El Barde.

References

External links
 Districts of Somalia
 Administrative map of El Barde District

Districts of Somalia

Bakool